DBL may refer to:

 Deep Belly Laughs
 Double Cheese Burger
 Dansk Biografisk Leksikon, a Danish biographical dictionary
 Dashing Buffalo, a professional League of Legends team based in Ho Chi Minh City, Vietnam
 Database Management Library, a C++ object-oriented programming library
 dBase Language, the computer language implemented by dBASE Plus, dB2K, and Visual dBASE software
 Design-based learning, a modern pedagogy
 Devizes branch line, a defunct railway line running from Holt to Pewsey from 1857 to 1966
 Digital Bibliography & Library Project's DBL-Browser
 Don Bosco High & Technical School, Liluah, an all-boys, English medium school near the city of Kolkata, India
 Double (disambiguation), various meanings
 Double bottom line, an accounting framework that measures fiscal performance
 Drawing Black Lines, the second album by American Post-Hardcore band, Project 86
 Drexel Burnham Lambert, an investment bank
 Dunstan Baby Language, a theory about early baby language
 Dyirbal language, ISO 639-3 language code dbl

Sports
 DBL Arena
 Darwin Baseball League, Northern Territory, Australia
 Development Basketball League, a basketball league for middle and high school students in Indonesia
 Dominet Bank Ekstraliga, a former sponsored name of the Polish Basketball League
 Dutch Basketball League, the top professional basketball league in the Netherlands

See also 
 Down by Law (disambiguation)